Grand Chief may refer to:

Grand Chief, title of leader of the Grand Council of the Crees
Grand Chief, title of leader of the Assembly of Manitoba Chiefs
Grand Chief, title of leader of the Mi'kmaq people
Grand Chief, title of leader of the Nishnawbe Aski Nation
Grand Chief, title used in the Papua New Guinea honours system